Academy 360  may refer to:

 Academy 360, Sunderland, a state-funded school in Sunderland, Tyne and Wear, England
 Spectrum360 (also known as Academy 360), a private school in Verona, New Jersey, United States